Syed Hasan Ali Chowdhury (– 30 May 1981) was a Bangladeshi politician, minister and the former Nawab of Dhanbari. He served as a Minister for Commerce and Industry in East Pakistan after being elected in 1962 elections.

Early life
Chowdhury was born in Dhanbari, Tangail to a zamindar family. His grandfather Syed Nawab Ali Chowdhury was one of the founders of Dhaka University and the first Muslim minister of United Bengal.

Career
Chowdhury entered politics by joining A. K. Fazlul Huq's Krishak Sramik Party. He contested for the party in the 1937 Bengal legislative elections, winning in the Tangail North (Madhupur-Gopalpur) constituency.

In 1962, he was made Minister for Commerce and Industry of East Pakistan. After the Bangladesh Liberation War, he contested as a Bangladesh Awami League candidate from the Tangail-1 (Madhupur-Dhanbari) constituency in the second Bangladeshi parliamentary election held on 18 February 1979. He later joined the Bangladesh National Party.

Death and legacy
He died on 30 May 1981. After his death, his daughter Syeda Ashiqua Akbar was elected as the member of parliament following a by-election.

References

1910s births
1981 deaths
Bangladesh Nationalist Party politicians
Bangladeshi people of Arab descent
People from Tangail District
2nd Jatiya Sangsad members
Bogra family
Bengal MLAs 1937–1945